The Art of Ama Ata Aidoo is a 2014 Ghanaian documentary written and directed by Yaba Badoe.

Plot
The documentary film gives insight of the life of playwright and novelist Ama Ata Aidoo, coming to a homeland to empower woman despite the challenges they face.

Cast
Ama Ata Aidoo

References

Ghanaian documentary films
2014 films
2014 documentary films